Sharia4Belgium was a Belgian Islamist organisation which called for Belgium to convert itself into an Islamic state. In February 2015 the group was designated a terrorist organisation by a Belgian judge. By 7 October 2012 the organization was disbanded.

In 2010 Sharia4Belgium disrupted a lecture by Benno Barnard at the University of Antwerp. In early April 2010, Belgium's interior minister Annemie Turtelboom ordered the monitoring of the organisation's website.

In 2011 the organisation called the death of Vlaams Belang politician Marie-Rose Morel a "punishment of Allah". Then-defence minister Pieter De Crem was threatened with his life on the internet because of the Belgian participation in Operation Odyssey Dawn in Libya. Sharia4Belgium was summoned to the correctional tribunal for incitement to hatred in 2011. 

In 2016 the organization was classed as terrorist organization as Fouad Belkacem had recruited several young men to fight for the Islamic State in Syria. Belkacem and 45 other members were found guilty of membership in a terrorist group.

Fouad Belkacem
Fouad Belkacem, with dual Belgian and Moroccan citizenship, was the spokesman of the organisation and was inspired by UK-based Islamist Anjem Choudary. Also known by the alias "Abu Imran", he repeatedly made controversial comments, and stated he had been praying for Osama bin Laden. 

When Belkacem was invited to the 2012 Global Shariah Conference, organised by the radical Islamic movement Sharia4Holland, the Party for Freedom asked ministers Ivo Opstelten and Gerd Leers to treat Belkacem as persona non grata. 

Belkacem has a criminal record for burglary and resisting arrest and was sentenced in 2002, 2004 and 2007. In 2012, he was re-sentenced in Antwerp to two years' imprisonment for incitement of hatred towards non-Muslims. Morocco was seeking his extradition in connection with the drug trade.

Belkacem was arrested on the morning of 7 June 2012. He was sentenced in Morocco for possession of illegal drugs.

On 11 February 2015, Belkacem was sentenced to 12 years' imprisonment in Belgium. In October 2018, he was stripped of his Belgian citizenship.

References

Islamism in Belgium
Religious organisations based in Belgium
Sharia in Europe
Salafi Jihadist groups
Defunct organizations designated as terrorist in Europe
People who lost Belgian citizenship
Political controversies in Belgium
Islam-related controversies in Europe
Religious controversies in Belgium